Noora Noor  aka  Noora (born 8 July 1979) is a Somali-Norwegian neo soul singer.

Career
Noor started early on her musical journey, performing locally from the age of 8. She got a recording contract with Warner Music at only 15. She then began working with Stargate (production team) to make her first album. The success of the album launched Stargate's international career as R&B/Soul producers.

Noor's debut album, Curious, was released in 1999 and became one of the first notable Scandinavian R&B albums. The single "Need You" was also played constantly on "The Lick" on MTV. Curious became a success also in Japan with more than 40,000 sales. It took five years until the release of her second album, All I Am, in 2004, as Noor was diagnosed with tuberculosis. The album included more self-penned songs, written in collaboration with US and UK songwriters. She is also featured on Madcon's 2007 album So Dark the Con of Man and some Tommy Tee releases. In addition, Noor played Maria Magdalen in a big outdoor version of Jesus Christ Superstar.

Her most recent album, Soul Deep, was released in Norway in March 2009 to rave reviews and was rated 6 "dice" in Norway's major newspaper Verdens Gang. Recorded in San Jose, California, with local blues and soul musicians, it also features members of Little Charlie & The Nightcats. The producer was Kid Andersen, the Norwegian band's guitar virtuoso. The album was released outside Norway during 2010, with the first single, in Benelux, made available in April/May 2010.

In March 2011, Noor participated in the Norwegian national selection for the Eurovision Song Contest 2011, the Melodi Grand Prix, with the song "Gone with the wind".

Discography

Albums
1999: Curious
2004: All I Am
2009: Soul Deep

Singles
 "Official"
 "Need You"
 "Zeros"
 "Feelin' It" (with Tommy Tee and Jo Jo Pellegrino)
 "Forget What I Said"
 "Funky Way"
 "What Man Have Done"
 "Gone with the Wind"

Appearances
 "Hard to Read" (So Dark the Con of Man) - Madcon
 "The Royal PortKids" (CD single)
 "Old Angel Midnight" - Paal Flaata (2008)
 "Elias og Kongeskipet" (movie and CD single)
 "The Princess and the Frog" (Disney 2010 - Norwegian version)

Awards
 Hitawards (1999): Female Artist of the Year
 Natt og Dag prisen (1999): Best Live Artist
 Spellemannprisen (Norwegian Grammy Award) (2009): Female Artist of the Year

References

External links
 

1979 births
Living people
Soul singers
Norwegian composers
English-language singers from Norway
Neo soul singers
Somalian emigrants to Norway
Spellemannprisen winners
21st-century Norwegian women singers
Ballad musicians
21st-century Norwegian singers